John Shanahan (27 February 1924 – 7 October 1987) was a New Zealand swimmer who won a bronze medal representing his country at the 1950 British Empire Games.

At the 1950 British Empire Games he won the bronze medal as part of the men's 330 yards medley relay. His teammates for the relay were Lyall Barry and Peter Mathieson. He also competed in the men's 220 yards breaststroke where he placed 4th.

See also
 List of Commonwealth Games medallists in swimming (men)

References

1924 births
1987 deaths
Commonwealth Games bronze medallists for New Zealand
New Zealand male breaststroke swimmers
Swimmers at the 1950 British Empire Games
Commonwealth Games medallists in swimming
20th-century New Zealand people
Medallists at the 1950 British Empire Games